Nicolas Jebran is a Lebanese fashion designer famous for haute couture in addition to his line of accessories, shoes and bags called "Jebran".

Jebran started showing interest in art very early on. In 1999 he took part in Lebanese reality television competition Studio El Fan (in Arabic ستوديو الفن) in fashion category coming second. 
In 2000, he established his fashion house in Abu Dhabi, UAE and in 2001 launched his first line. He also continued his studies in design of jewelry and accessories in Beirut. He later opened another fashion house in Beirut, Lebanon. His designs are worn by famous pan-Arab and international stars.

References

External links
Official website
Facebook

Lebanese fashion designers
Living people
1974 births